Alexis Meade (born Alexander Spencer Meade) is a fictional character from the ABC dramedy series Ugly Betty, initially portrayed by  Elizabeth Penn Payne (when she was listed in the credits as "Masked Lady") for the first twelve episodes of her appearance. Alexis was portrayed by Rebecca Romijn for the remainder of the series.

Biography

Meade was a background presence in the series since its debut. The former editor-in-chief of Hudson magazine, Meade was believed dead by the public. Meade's example as an editor was held over Daniel Meade's head by his father Bradford, and Meade's assumed death cast a pall over the entire family, contributing to his mother Claire's alcoholism.

Meade appeared repeatedly, beginning with the first episode, swaddled in bandages. She conspired with Wilhelmina Slater to take over MODE magazine from Daniel. She also actively tried to implicate Bradford in the death of former MODE editor-in-chief Fey Sommers. Dialogue between Alexis and Wilhelmina fueled speculation the mysterious bandaged woman was actually Sommers.

In the episode In or Out, Daniel told Betty that his sibling had been killed in a skiing accident. In the final moments of the episode, Wilhelmina told the mysterious bandaged woman, now out of her bandages, that her "skiing accident" had done her a world of good, and called her Alex. The woman corrected Wilhelmina, advising her that her name was Alexis.

Alexis attended Fashion Week in the episode I'm Coming Out. After initially flirting with Daniel, she told him her true identity, explaining she had felt from a very young age that she was "in the wrong skin". This revelation shocked Daniel. Wilhelmina insinuated Alexis into the MODE "up and coming designers" fashion show. Following the show, Bradford began a speech but Alexis interrupted him, announcing her identity. Police appeared and arrested Bradford for the murder of Fey Sommers.

Following Bradford's arrest, Alexis moved to consolidate her control of Meade Publications and tried to install Wilhelmina as editor-in-chief of MODE, but Daniel obtained an injunction to block her actions. At the instigation of Betty and their mother, Alexis and Daniel set aside their differences and formed a fragile détente.

Daniel had always thought their father treated his sibling better than him. Alexis told Daniel that Bradford spent so much time with Alexis taking part in stereotypically masculine activities, trying to try to "cure" her of being trans. When Alexis told her father she was going to transition, her father said that if she did, she would be cut off from the family forever and that he would prefer her dead. She also said the reason she didn't want to tell Daniel the truth was because she feared her brother felt the same way as their father.

Alexis later had a change of heart about Daniel. When Wilhelmina reminded her that he is the enemy and should be fired in favor of Wilhelmina as editor-in-chief, Alexis told her she wouldn't fire her own brother. Wilhelmina ended their partnership, and she endeavored to drive a wedge into their sibling relationship.

Alexis was furious when she found out Daniel was having an affair with Grace Chin.

After Bradford was released from jail and had Alexis fired, Claire Meade, the actual legal owner of MODE, appoints Daniel and Alexis as co-editors-in-chief in an effort to keep the Meade family from falling apart. But although Daniel makes some effort to share, it appears Alexis might still be trying to outdo Daniel even as they try to work together for the sake of the family. In the meantime, Wilhelmina bides her time and tries to sow chaos through fueling the siblings' enmity.

Alexis was also hampered by Bradford's scheme to get rid of her, who plotted with Wilhelmina to pay off Rodrigo Veloso, a creative director at sister publication "MODE Brasil", to get her out of the United States by having him romance Alexis after she falls for him. Alexis later found out about Rodrigo's deal after she picked up his phone and overheard the conversation, prompting Alexis to dump him. After this Alexis' hatred of her father grew, leading her to call a hired hitman to see about getting rid of someone "...in her life."

In the season one finale, an intoxicated Daniel stumbled into her office, his drug use out of control. As she was driving him to the hospital in their father's car, she realized the brakes had been cut and the car crashed. The season finale ended with them lying unconscious beside each other.

At the beginning of season two Alexis was in a coma, waking at the end of the season premiere with partial retrograde amnesia, not remembering the past two years or becoming a woman. A few episodes later, while attending a dinner hosted by Bradford and Wilhelmina, she started to remember after witnessing an angry exchange between Bradford and Daniel, mirroring Bradford's own treatment of Alexis prior to her transition.

In the weeks that followed, Bradford decided to bond with Alexis, which didn't sit well with Daniel, who he suspected of taking advantage of her amnesia as a way to reestablish the father-son bond they had. This ended tragically with Bradford's fatal heart attack during his wedding to Wilhelmina. Before his death he asked the two to be civil and forgave them. But that union did not last long: after learning Bradford (in an unfinished taped will) left no clear successor for the CEO spot at Meade Publications, Alexis and Daniel resumed their competitive rivalry with a paintball contest. Unfortunately after Daniel tried to help a seemingly injured Alexis, she took his paint gun and shot him with it, making her the President/CEO of Meade Publications.

Alexis, Daniel and Claire were also responsible for terminating Wilhelmina's job at MODE after learning of her attempt to manipulate the Meade family, especially her attempt to marry Bradford. However, in the season two finale, after Wilhelmina returned to Mode through her plan involving Bradford's baby, Alexis made her Editor-in-Chief after Wilhelmina pointed out to her how easy running the magazine was, and how much easier it would be if Daniel left.

But it turned out Wilhelmina may have used Alexis' friendship as a front in her quest to make MODE a priority over the other Meade publications. When Alexis announced she was going to help get Claire's Hot Flash off the ground, Wilhelmina tricked her into appearing on Alexis' favorite TV show "Live with Regis and Kelly", where she was sabotaged by the two hosts. After Claire scorned her for giving in to Wilhelmina by telling her that she was a puppet, Alexis finally came to her senses when Betty showed her a mock-up of MODE Daniel got by mistake. Alexis, more impressed with her brother's ideas than with Wilhelmina's (especially after seeing her version plummet in sales, along with fan letters from readers sent to Daniel) gave Daniel his former EiC job back, demoting Wilhelmina back to Creative Director.

In the episode "Crime of Fashion", it was revealed Alexis pushed Christina, pregnant with Wilhelmina's child, down a flight of stairs. She told Betty she didn't mean to and she was so upset at Wilhelmina that she kept seeing her when she looked at Christina. At the end of the episode, Alexis turned herself into the police, but not before revealing to her mother that she, not Daniel, was the biological father of Daniel Jr.

Following her arrest, in exchange for Wilhelmina's help in escaping prosecution for attempted murder, Alexis agreed to give 50% of her Meade Publications stock to Wilhelmina's unborn child and 50% to Daniel, causing ownership of the company to now be divided equally between the two. She then left New York City for an extended trip to France. Before departing, she promised Daniel she would try to connect with DJ and assured her mother she would always be in her life.

It is also known that her mother Claire Meade and her maternal half-brother Tyler Meade-Hartley visited her in Paris in Season 4.

Critical response

Slate named the character as one of the reasons they were looking forward to the return of the show in fall 2007.

Departure
It was announced that in Season 3, the role of Alexis will be demoted from a regular character to a recurring character.  Romijn stated she is unhappy with the direction the writers have given her character.  Her exact words to the New York Post's Popwrap were:

"They made a tremendous amount of changes, especially with the writing staff [during the writers' strike]. And while I know I'll be coming back next season, with all the changes, I'm not sure they can take care of my character the way they have been. So I'll be leaving, back in a recurring capacity, but time for me to leave and find something else."

E! Online's Kristin Dos Santos reported Alexis exited the show in Season 3 due to Romijn's pregnancy.

References

Female characters in television
Fictional characters from New York City
Television characters introduced in 2006
Fictional magazine editors
Fictional socialites
Fictional transgender women
Ugly Betty characters
Fictional LGBT characters in television